Lloyd Stuart Swanton (born 14 August 1960) is an Australian jazz double bassist, bass guitarist, and composer.

Swanton was a member of Dynamic Hepnotics in 1986 and co-founded jazz trio The Necks in 1987 with Chris Abrahams and Tony Buck.

Biography
In 1987 he co-founded jazz trio The Necks with Chris Abrahams on keyboards and Tony Buck on drums. In 1991 he formed his own group, The Catholics. He has performed solo improvisation concerts on double bass. Swanton has performed with The Benders, Clarion Fracture Zone, Sydney Symphony, Vince Jones, Alpha Centauri Ensemble, the Mighty Reapers, the Seymour Group, Tim Finn, Stephen Cummings and Wendy Matthews. He was also a long-serving member of the Bernie McGann Trio and the Bernie McGann Quartet.

As well as music for his own bands, Swanton has composed several film soundtracks. For many years Swanton hosted the radio show Mixed Marriage on Eastside Radio in Sydney, a weekly program looking at crossings of jazz with other musical styles.

Discography

As leader
 Ambon (Bugle, 2015)

With The Benders
 E (Hot, 1983)
 False Laughter (Hot, 1984)
 Distance (Hot, 1985)

With The Catholics
 The Catholics (Rufus, 1992)
 Simple (Rufus, 1994)
 Life On Earth (Rufus/PolyGram, 1997)
 Barefoot (Rufus, 1999)
 Gondola (Rufus, 2006)
 Village (Bugle, 2007)
 Inter Vivos (Bugle, 2009)
 Yonder (Bugle, 2013)

With Clarion Fracture Zone
 What This Love Can Do (Rufus, 1994)
 Less Stable Elements (Rufus, 1996)

With Bernie McGann
 At Long Last (Emanem, 1987)
 Ugly Beauty (Spiral Scratch, 1991)
 McGann (Rufus, 1995)
 Playground (Rufus, 1997)
 Bundeena (Rufus, 2000)
 Double Dutch? (Rufus, 2010)
 Blue for Pablo Too (Rufus, 2005)
 Live at the Side On (Rufus, 2005)
 Solar (Rufus, 2009)
 Wending (Rufus, 2012)

With The Necks
 Sex (Spiral Scratch, 1989)
 Next (Spiral Scratch, 1990)
 Aquatic (Fish of Milk, 1994)
 Silent Night (Fish of Milk, 1996)
 Piano Bass Drums (Fish of Milk, 1998)
 The Boys (Wild Sound/MDS, 1998)
 Hanging Gardens (Fish of Milk, 1999)
 Aether (Fish of Milk, 2001)
 Athenaeum, Homebush, Quay & Raab (Fish of Milk, 2002)
 Drive By (Fish of Milk, 2003)
 Photosynthetic (Long Arms, 2003)
 Mosquito/See Through (Fish of Milk, 2004)
 Chemist (Fish of Milk, 2006)
 Townsville (Fish of Milk, 2007)
 Silverwater (Fish of Milk, 2009)
 Mindset (Fish of Milk, 2011) 
 Open (Northern Spy, 2013)
 Vertigo (Fish of Milk, 2015)
 Unfold (Ideologic Organ, 2017)
 Body (Northern Spy, 2018)
 Three (Northern Spy, 2020)

With Alister Spence
 Flux (Rufus, 2003)
 Mercury, (Rufus, 2006)
 Far Flung (Rufus, 2012)
 Live Alister (Spence Music, 2015)
 Not Everything but Enough (Alister Spence Music, 2017)

As sideman
With Vince Jones
 Trustworthy Little Sweethearts (EMI, 1988)
 Come in Spinner (ABC, 1990)
 One Day Spent (EMI, 1990)
 Future Girl (EMI, 1992)

With others
 Diana Anaid, Diana Ah Naid (Origin, 1997)
 Tony Buck, The Shape of Things to Come (1989)
 Stephen Cummings, Good Humour (Polydor, 1990)
 Dannielle Gaha & Louise Anton, Going for a Song (EastWest, 1997)
 Tim Hopkins, Tim Hopkins' Good Heavens! (Larrikin, 1993)
 Marc Hunter, Night & Day (ABC, 1990)
 Phillip Johnston, Diggin' Bones (Asynchronous, 2018)
 The Last Straw, The Last Straw (Spiral Scratch, 1990)
 Inga Liljestroem, Elk (Groovescooter, 2004)
 Jimmy Little, Resonate Festival (Mushroom, 2001)
 Dave MacRae, Southern Roots (Emanem, 1988)
 Wendy Matthews, Emigre (rooArt, 1990)
 Melanie Oxley & Chris Abrahams, Welcome to Violet (Remote Music, 1992)
 Tim Rollinson, Cause + Effect (Mercury, 1996)
 Phil Slater, The Thousands (Kimnara, 2007)
 Ross Wilson, Dark Side of the Man (WEA, 1989)
 Ross Wilson, Go Bongo Go Wild! (Wild Bongo, 2001)
 Underworld, Drift Episode 2 Atom (Smith Hyde, 2019)
 Wizards of Oz, Soundtrack (Polygram, 1988)
 Iannis Xenakis, Alpha Centauri Ensemble, Roger Woodward, Kraanerg (Etcetera, 1989)
 Julian Curwin, Midnight Lullaby (Romero Records, 2020)

Awards and nominations

APRA Awards
The APRA Awards are presented annually from 1982 by the Australasian Performing Right Association (APRA).

|-
| 2005 ||  "Drive By" (with Chris Abrahams and Tony Buck) || Most Performed Jazz Work || 
|-
| 2006 ||  "Chemist" (with Abrahams and Buck) || Most Performed Jazz Work || 
|-
| 2019
| "Body" (with Abrahams and Buck)
| Song of the Year
| 
|-

References

General
  Note: Archived [on-line] copy has limited functionality.
  Note: [on-line] version established at White Room Electronic Publishing Pty Ltd in 2007 and was expanded from the 2002 edition.

Specific

External links
Swanton, Lloyd (Stuart) biography at jazz.com

1960 births
APRA Award winners
Australian jazz double-bassists
Male double-bassists
Living people
Musicians from Sydney
Australian jazz composers
Male jazz composers
21st-century double-bassists
21st-century Australian male musicians
21st-century Australian musicians
Benders musicians
The Catholics members
The Necks members
The Last Straw (band) members
Wizards of Oz members
Clarion Fracture Zone members